Divination is the attempt to gain insight into a question or situation by way of an occultic, standardized process or ritual.

Divination may also refer to:

 Divination (album), a 2012 record by In Hearts Wake
 "Bu Ju", a short work anthologized in the Chu Ci
 "Divinations", a song by Mastodon from the 2009 album Crack the Skye

See also 
 Divinization (disambiguation)